Melrose railway station served the town of Melrose, Roxburghshire, Scotland from 1849 to 1969 on the Waverley Route.

History 

The station opened on 20 February 1849 by the North British Railway. The station was situated parallel with the road of the A6091 and the forecourt was at the end of Palma Place. The small goods yard was on the down side behind the platform and could only be accessed from the west; it consisted of three sidings. The siding to the north had a loop and passed through a  cast-iron framed wooden goods shed. Before the turn of the 20th century, the goods yard had been re-laid with two parallel sidings, one passing through the goods shed. The station was closed to goods traffic on 18 May 1964 but passenger service continued until the closure of the line on 6 January 1969.

Site today 

The down platform was demolished to make way for the A6091 Melrose bypass road. However the main station building and the up platform, including the canopy have been preserved.

References

External links 

Disused railway stations in the Scottish Borders
Railway stations in Great Britain opened in 1849
Railway stations in Great Britain closed in 1969
Beeching closures in Scotland
Former North British Railway stations
1849 establishments in Scotland